PP-76 Sargodha-V is a Constituency of Provincial Assembly of Punjab.

General elections 2013

 There were a total of 25 Candidates in the PP-33 Constituency
 Over 98,885 people voted in the elections.

General elections 2008

See also
 PP-75 Sargodha-IV
 PP-77 Sargodha-VI

References

External links
 Election commission Pakistan's official website
 Awazoday.com check result
 Official Website of Government of Punjab

Provincial constituencies of Punjab, Pakistan